José Luis "Chuck" Martín is a Puerto Rican  college basketball coach.  , he was an assistant coach at the University of Oregon. Martin was head coach at Marist College, a position he held for five seasons.

Basketball career
As a basketball player, Martin played for the Capitanes de Arecibo of the Baloncesto Superior Nacional (BSN) for five seasons.  He was coached by Raymond Dalmau, from whom he learned to be honest with his players, and his assistant Carlos Calcaño whom he credits as a source of inspirational quotes.  Players like Eddie Casiano and Javier Antonio Colón impressed Martin as opponents.

Collegiate coaching career (1998–present)

Marist (2008–2012)
After going 41–118 in five seasons, Martin was fired from Marist.

South Carolina (2017–2022)
Martin joined Frank Martin's staff at South Carolina.

Oregon (2022-present)
Joined as an assistant head coach in March 2022.

Personal life
Martin was born in San Juan, Puerto Rico, from where his family relocated to New York.  His original nickname was in Spanish, "Che", which eventually became "Chuck" because the English speakers couldn't pronounce it properly.  Likewise his actual last name, Martín, has an accent but its pronunciation became anglicized to "Martin".  When presenting himself, he does so as José Luis Martín and identifies as Puerto Rican. 

Martin is a 1993 graduate of Monmouth University with a bachelor's degree in communications. He and his wife, Lee, have three children. Martin retains links with the island to this day, taking his son to a tryout for the juvenile Puerto Rico national team in 2019.  He has expressed his interest in joining the program, which he cites as a source of great pride.

References

1969 births
basketball players from New York (state)
college men's basketball head coaches in the United States
living people
Marist Red Foxes men's basketball coaches
Puerto Rican basketball coaches
Puerto Rican men's basketball players
sportspeople from San Juan, Puerto Rico